Lycée de Garçons is a school located in Nouakchott, Mauritania. It is located on the Avenue Gamal Abdel Nasser, opposite the headquarters of Air Mauritania and next (east) to the  Radio Nationale headquarters.

See also

 Education in Mauritania
 Lists of schools

References

Nouakchott
Schools in Mauritania